Great Day may refer to:

 The Great Day, a 1921 British film
 Great Day (1930 film), an American film
 Great Day (1945 film), a British film
Great Day, a 1983 TV comedy film directed by Michael Preece

Music
 Great Day (album), a 1963 album by jazz saxophonist James Moody
 "Great Day", a song by The Whispers written Nicholas Caldwell, Willie L. Johnson 1969
 "Great Day", a song by Paul McCartney from his album Flaming Pie
"Great Day", a song by Madvillain from Madvillainy
"Great Days", the opening theme of JoJo's Bizarre Adventure: Diamond Is Unbreakable from episode 27 onwards

Other
 Great Day (play), a 1945 play by Lesley Storm

See also
Best Days (disambiguation)
Greatest Day (disambiguation)